The 1989–90 Women's European Champions Cup was the 29th edition of the Europe's competition for national champions women's handball clubs, running between October 1989 and 27 May 1990. Defending champion Hypo Niederösterreich defeated Kuban Krasnodar in the final to win its second title.

Qualifying round

Round of 16

Quarter-finals

Semifinals

Final

References

Women's EHF Champions League
Ihf Women's European Cup, 1989-90
Ihf Women's European Cup, 1989-90
IHF
IHF